The 2006–07 Bangladeshi cricket season featured a Test series between Bangladesh and India.

Honours
 National Cricket League – Dhaka Division
 One-Day League – Dhaka Division
 Most runs – Gazi Salahuddin 807 @ 42.47 (HS 165)
 Most wickets – Shabbir Khan 53 @ 28.30 (BB 7–134)

Test series
India played 2 Test matches and 3 limited overs internationals, winning one Test and two internationals.  The remaining Test was drawn and the third international was abandoned due to torrential rain.  For information about this tour, see: Indian cricket team in Bangladesh in 2007.

See also
 History of cricket in Bangladesh

Further reading
 Wisden Cricketers' Almanack 2008

External sources
 Miscellaneous articles re Bangladesh cricket
 CricInfo re Bangladesh
 CricketArchive re tournaments in Bangladesh

2006 in Bangladeshi cricket
2007 in Bangladeshi cricket
Bangladeshi cricket seasons from 2000–01
Domestic cricket competitions in 2006–07